Harald Schneider (born 8 June 1966) is a retired Austrian football defender.

References

1966 births
Living people
Austrian footballers
LASK players
FK Austria Wien players
FC Tirol Innsbruck players
Association football defenders
Austrian Football Bundesliga players
Austria international footballers
FC Wacker Innsbruck players